Derek Eastman (born November 25, 1980) is an American professional ice hockey player who is currently playing with the HC Fassa in the Alps Hockey League (AlpsHL). Also owns a State Farm agency in Sugar Grove, IL.

Awards and honors

References

External links

1980 births
American men's ice hockey defensemen
Columbia Inferno players
HC Gardena players
Ice hockey players from Minnesota
Iowa Stars players
Living people
Norfolk Admirals players
Omaha Lancers players
Rødovre Mighty Bulls players
St. Cloud State Huskies men's ice hockey players
Storhamar Dragons players
Tulsa Oilers (1992–present) players
Wipptal Broncos players